The 1950 Hamilton municipal election was held on December 6, 1950, to select one Mayor, four Controllers, and sixteen members of the Hamilton, Ontario City Council, as well as members of the local Board of Education. In addition, this election was accompanied by six referendums, each dealing with a major issue in the city at the time.

Referendums

|-
! colspan="7" | Hamilton, Ontario, Municipal referendums, 1950 (Money related)
|- style="text-align:center;background:#E9E9E9;"
! rowspan="2" style="text-align:left;" | Question
! colspan="2" |  Yes
! colspan="2" |  No
! colspan="2" | Voter Turnout
|-
! Votes
! %
! Votes
! %
! Votes
! %
|-
| style="text-align:left;" | "By-law to raise $250,000.00 for a grant to Hamilton College." 
| style="text-align:right;" |13,863
| style="text-align:right;" |44.03% 
| style="text-align:right;" |17,625 
| style="text-align:right;" |55.97%
| style="text-align:right;" |31,488 
| style="text-align:right;" |52.75%
|-
| style="text-align:left;" | "By-law to borrow the sum of $850,000.00 by the issue of debentures for improvements on the Old Jolly Cut Road and to provide four-lanepavement." 
| style="text-align:right;" |19,492
| style="text-align:right;" |61.73%
| style="text-align:right;" |12,085
| style="text-align:right;" |38.27%
| style="text-align:right;" |31,577 
| style="text-align:right;" |52.90%
|-
| style="text-align:left;" | "By-law to authorize the issue of debentures for $1,750,000.00for the purpose of erecting an arena adaptable for auditorium use."
| style="text-align:right;" |12,107
| style="text-align:right;" |38.36% 
| style="text-align:right;" |19,456 
| style="text-align:right;" |61.64%
| style="text-align:right;" |31,563 
| style="text-align:right;" |52.88%
|-
|colspan="7" style="background-color:#E9E9E9" |
|- style="background:"#FFFFFF";"
| colspan="5" style="text-align:right;background-color:#FFFFFF"| Total Eligible Voters
!style="text-align:center;background-color:#FFFFFF"|59,690
!style="text-align:center;background-color:#FFFFFF"|52.98%
|- 
|- style="background:"#FFFFFF";"
| colspan="5" style="text-align:right;background-color:#FFFFFF"| Total Voters
!style="text-align:center;background-color:#FFFFFF"|112,650
!style="text-align:center;background-color:#FFFFFF"|100%
|- 
| style="text-align:left;" colspan="7" |Note: Vote totals for each question were different as voters did not need to vote on each question  Note: Only property owners in Hamilton were eligible to vote for money related referendums.
|- 
| style="text-align:left;" colspan="13" |Sources: "City Clerk Advises Upon Technique of Casting Your Vote," Hamilton Spectator, Tuesday,December 5, 1950, pg. 31.Mountain Access Only Is Supported," Hamilton Spectator, Thursday, December 7, 1950, pg. 20.
|}

|- 
! colspan="7" | Hamilton, Ontario, Municipal referendums, 1950
|- 
! rowspan="2" style="text-align:left;" | Question
! colspan="2" |  Yes
! colspan="2" |  No
! colspan="2" | Voter Turnout
|-
! Votes
! %
! Votes
! %
! Votes
! %
|-
| style="text-align:left;" | "Voting on by-law to extend the terms of Council members to two yearsafter the year 1951."
| style="text-align:right;" |19,591
| style="text-align:right;" |42.96%
| style="text-align:right;" |26,015 
| style="text-align:right;" |57.04%
| style="text-align:right;" |45,606 
| style="text-align:right;" |40.49%
|-
| style="text-align:left;" | "Are you in favour of the construction of an auditorium building and agymnasium building upon the assent of the electors at a later date?"
| style="text-align:right;" |20,665
| style="text-align:right;" |43.04%
| style="text-align:right;" |27,347
| style="text-align:right;" |56.96%
| style="text-align:right;" |48,012 
| style="text-align:right;" |46.62%
|-
| style="text-align:left;" | "Are you in favour of public games and sports on the Lord's Day to beregulated by municipal bylaw under the authority of the Lord's Day(Ontario) Act, 1950?"
| style="text-align:right;" |20,004
| style="text-align:right;" |37.29%
| style="text-align:right;" |33,643 
| style="text-align:right;" |62.71%
| style="text-align:right;" |53,647 
| style="text-align:right;" |47.62%
|-
|colspan="7" style="background-color:#E9E9E9" |
|- style="background:"#FFFFFF";"
| colspan="5" style="text-align:right;background-color:#FFFFFF"| Total Voters
!style="text-align:center;background-color:#FFFFFF"|112,650
!style="text-align:center;background-color:#FFFFFF"|100%
|- 
| style="text-align:left;" colspan="7" |Note: Vote totals for each question were different as voters did not need to vote on each question  Note: All voters were eligible to vote for questions not related to money.
|- 
| style="text-align:left;" colspan="13" |Sources: "City Clerk Advises Upon Technique of Casting Your Vote," Hamilton Spectator, Tuesday, December 5, 1950, pg. 31."Questions fail to find favour," Hamilton Spectator, Thursday, December 7, 1950, pg. 20.
|}

Mayoral Election

In the months before the vote, rumours circulated the city that the city's popular mayor, Lloyd Jackson, would face a serious contest from a number of prominent Controllers, namely William K. Warrender and Henry Arnott Hicks. Despite their amicable relationship with the mayor, their terms on council were widely viewed as spent establishing themselves for a mayoral run.

On November 17, Labor-Progressive Party executive member and former city Controller Helen Anderson Coulson announced her intention to stand against the mayor. Discussions concerning possible opponents for the mayor waned after Warrender and Hicks announced their intentions to stand for re-election to the Board of Control, and the possibility of an acclamation for the mayoralty seemed certain. Coulson made the announcement, stating, "In view of the urgent need for the labour movement to oppose a second term for the sitting incumbent mayor, I have decided...to contest the mayoralty.

Coulson's announcement brought both indignation and dismissal from prominent officials in the city, with Mayor Jackson simply quipping, "Let her come", while Controller Warrender pressed the fact that an avowed Communist was seeking the highest office in the city and the voters should rebuke her for her views. Hicks made a statement to the Spectator the following day, saying that the voters of Hamilton should be, "stirred out of their lethargy to realize that there are Communists in our midst making a bold bid for support.

The city's organized labour movement convened shortly after the close of nominations to study the issue of mayoral endorsement. Rather than take the side of Mayor Jackson, a conservative-minded politician or that of Coulson, an avowed Communist, the city's unions pushed for a stronger get-out-the-vote campaign and made individual endorsements for aldermanic and controller seats.

Jackson was endorsed by a number of groups, most prominently a taxpayers group called Hamiltonians for Sound Civic Government. Calling itself a group of 'public-spirited citizens', Hamiltonians for Sound Civic Government paid for a series of advertisements in the Hamilton Spectator, supporting the mayor and most of the sitting Board of Control.

Coulson was shut out of most advertising in the Spectator, while Jackson maintained a considerable presence, actively highlighting his platform points of reevaluating the city's tax assessment process, constructing more public recreation facilities, including outdoor pools and skating rinks, and improving traffic in the city core.

During the time of the election, Jackson found himself embroiled in controversy over comments made concerning potential annexation of land in Barton Township to the south of the city's limits at Fennell Avenue. City engineers noted that it would be appropriate for Hamilton to take control of lands as far south as Limeridge Road. Controllers debated the necessity of expanding farther onto the Mountain, urging the mayor to instead consider looking to lands along the shore of Lake Ontario.

On election night, Jackson told the Spectator, "I cannot tell you just what it means to one's faith, confidence, and courage to know that the great majority of the citizens are behind one", with the paper editorializing that the win was a "vote of confidence in the mayor's leadership, and a tribute to his vigorous administration of civic affairs."

|-
!rowspan="2" colspan="2"|Candidate
!rowspan="2" colspan="1"|Endorsing Party
!colspan="3"|Popular vote
|-
! %
! ±%
|-
| style="background-color:#00BFFF;" |
| style="text-align:left;" | Lloyd Douglas Jackson (incumbent)
| style="text-align:left;" |Independent
| style="text-align:right;" |49,924
| style="text-align:right;" |85.79%
|-
| style="background-color:#FF0000;" |
| style="text-align:left;" | Helen Anderson Coulson
| style="text-align:left;" |Labor-Progressive
| style="text-align:right;" |8,270
| style="text-align:right;" |14.21%
|-
| style="text-align:right;background-color:#FFFFFF;" colspan="3" |Total votes
| style="text-align:right;background-color:#FFFFFF;" |58,194
| style="text-align:right;background-color:#FFFFFF;" |100%
|- 
| style="text-align:right;background-color:#FFFFFF;" colspan="3" |Registered voters
| style="text-align:right;background-color:#FFFFFF;" |n/a
| style="text-align:right;background-color:#FFFFFF;" |n/a
|- 
| style="text-align:left;" colspan="6" |Note: Candidate campaign colours are based on their supporting party's or group's colour.
|- 
| style="text-align:left;" colspan="13" |Sources: "Vote for Mayor", Hamilton Spectator, Thursday, December 7, 1950, pg. 19.
|}

Board of Control

Candidates

|-
!rowspan="2" colspan="2"|Candidate
!rowspan="2" colspan="1"|Endorsing Party/Group
!colspan="3"|Popular vote
|-
! %
! ±%
|-
| style="background-color:#B2BEB5;" |
| style="text-align:left;" | William Kenneth Warrender (incumbent)
| style="text-align:left;" |Independent
| style="text-align:right;" |31,014
| style="text-align:right;" |1
|-
| style="background-color:#B2BEB5;" |
| style="text-align:left;" | Samuel Leslie Parker (incumbent)
| style="text-align:left;" |Independent
| style="text-align:right;" |29,314
| style="text-align:right;" |2
|-
| style="background-color:#FF0000;" |
| style="text-align:left;" | Henry Arnott Hicks (incumbent)
| style="text-align:left;" |Liberal
| style="text-align:right;" |27,723
| style="text-align:right;" |3
|-
| style="background-color:#FADA5E"|
| style="text-align:left;" | Samuel Lawrence
| style="text-align:left;" |CCF
| style="text-align:right;" |24,763
| style="text-align:right;" |4
|-
| style="background-color:#B2BEB5;" |
| style="text-align:left;" | Hugh John Sedgwick
| style="text-align:left;" | Independent
| style="text-align:right;" |18,730
| style="text-align:right;" |5
|-
| style="background-color:#B2BEB5;" |
| style="text-align:left;" | Hugh McIntyre
| style="text-align:left;" |Independent
| style="text-align:right;" |18,558
| style="text-align:right;" |6
|-
| style="background-color:#5D8AA8;" |
| style="text-align:left;" | Bessie Hughton
| style="text-align:left;" | Women's Civic Club
| style="text-align:right;" |15,786
| style="text-align:right;" |7
|-
| style="background-color:#B2BEB5;" |
| style="text-align:left;" | Walter Biggs
| style="text-align:left;" |Independent
| style="text-align:right;" |11,636
| style="text-align:right;" |8
|-
| style="text-align:right;background-color:#FFFFFF;" colspan="3" |Total votes
| style="text-align:right;background-color:#FFFFFF;" |n/a
| style="text-align:right;background-color:#FFFFFF;" |100%
|- 
| style="text-align:right;background-color:#FFFFFF;" colspan="3" |Registered voters
| style="text-align:right;background-color:#FFFFFF;" |n/a
| style="text-align:right;background-color:#FFFFFF;" |n/a
|- 
| style="text-align:left;" colspan="6" |Note: Candidate campaign colours are based on their supporting party's or group's colour.
|- 
| style="text-align:left;" colspan="13" |Sources: "Hamilton Board of Control Results", Hamilton Spectator, December 11, 1946, News.
|}

References

1950 Ontario municipal elections
1950